Rubus riograndis is a North American species of dewberry in section Verotriviales of the genus Rubus, a member of the rose family. It has been found only in Texas in the south-central United States.

References

External links
Lady Bird Johnson Wildflower Center, University of Texas

riograndis
Plants described in 1941
Flora of Texas